Punto Azul is a regional airline based in Malabo, Equatorial Guinea. Its main HUB base is Malabo International Airport. The airline operates scheduled flights mainly from the capital of Malabo, private charters for oil and gas industry of Equatorial Guinea, and cargo.

Destinations 

As of January 2016, Punto Azul operates following destinations:

 Malabo, Equatorial Guinea – Hub
 Bata, Equatorial Guinea
 Yaoundé, Cameroon
 Douala, Cameroon
 Accra, Ghana
 São Tomé, São Tomé and Príncipe

Fleet

Current fleet 

As of March 2020, Punto Azul operates the following aircraft:

Former fleet 
The airline previously operated the following aircraft as of June 2016:
 2 further Embraer ERJ 145

Club Azul 
Punto Azul was the first airline from Equatorial Guinea to establish a frequent flyer program.

References 

Airlines banned in the European Union
Airlines established in 2013
Airlines of Equatorial Guinea
Airlines formerly banned in the European Union